Madison County is a county located in the U.S. state of Mississippi. As of the 2020 census, the population was 109,145. The county seat is Canton. The county is named for U.S. President James Madison.

Madison County is part of the Jackson, MS Metropolitan Statistical Area.

Geography
The southeastern border of the county is defined by the old course of the Pearl River before it was dammed to create the  Ross Barnett Reservoir.

The boundaries of the county are set in Mississippi Code section 19-1-89 as:
Madison County is bounded by beginning at a point on Big Black River, where the same crosses the center line in township twelve, range three, east; thence east to the old Choctaw boundary line; thence north on said boundary line to the center line of township twelve, range five, east; thence through the center of said township twelve, range five, east, to the range line between townships five and six, east; thence south on said range line to Pearl River; thence down said river, with its meanderings, to the line between townships six and seven, north; thence west on said township line to the basis meridian of the Choctaw survey; thence north on said meridian line to the line between townships seven and eight, north; thence west on said township line to the line between ranges two and three, west; thence north on said range line to Big Black River; thence up said river, with its meanderings, to the beginning.

Major highways

  Interstate 55
  U.S. Highway 49
  U.S. Highway 51
  Mississippi Highway 16
  Mississippi Highway 17
  Mississippi Highway 22
  Mississippi Highway 43
 Natchez Trace Parkway

Adjacent counties
 Attala County (north)
 Leake County (east)
 Scott County (southeast)
 Rankin County (south)
 Hinds County (southwest)
 Yazoo County (west)

National protected area
 Natchez Trace Parkway (part)

Demographics

2020 census

As of the 2020 United States Census, there were 109,145 people, 40,046 households, and 28,374 families residing in the county.

2000 census
As of the census of 2000, there were 74,674 people, 27,219 households, and 19,325 families residing in the county.  The population density was 104 people per square mile (40/km2).  There were 28,781 housing units at an average density of 40 per square mile (16/km2).  The racial makeup of the county was 60.29% White, 37.48% Black or African American, 0.11% Native American, 1.30% Asian, 0.02% Pacific Islander, 0.27% from other races, and 0.53% from two or more races.  0.99% of the population were Hispanic or Latino of any race.

There were 27,219 households, out of which 37.40% had children under the age of 18 living with them, 51.90% were married couples living together, 15.60% had a female householder with no husband present, and 29.00% were non-families. 25.00% of all households were made up of individuals, and 6.70% had someone living alone who was 65 years of age or older.  The average household size was 2.67 and the average family size was 3.23.

In the county, the population was spread out, with 28.60% under the age of 18, 8.90% from 18 to 24, 32.40% from 25 to 44, 20.30% from 45 to 64, and 9.70% who were 65 years of age or older.  The median age was 33 years. For every 100 females, there were 90.20 males.  For every 100 females age 18 and over, there were 86.20 males.

The median income for a household in the county was $46,970, and the median income for a family was $58,172. Males had a median income of $41,460 versus $29,170 for females. The per capita income for the county was $23,469.  About 10.60% of families and 14.00% of the population were below the poverty line, including 21.30% of those under age 18 and 13.20% of those age 65 or over.

Madison County has the highest per capita income in the State of Mississippi. It is the only county in Mississippi with a per capita income higher than the national average.

Communities

Cities
 Canton (county seat)
 Gluckstadt
 Madison
 Ridgeland

Town
 Flora

Census-designated place
 Kearney Park

Other unincorporated communities
 Camden
 Farmhaven
 Livingston
 Sharon
 Way

Ghost town
 Beatties Bluff
 Stokes

Government and infrastructure
The county operates the Madison County Jail. Normally pre-trial federal inmates from central Mississippi are held at this jail.

Education
There are two school districts: Madison County School District and Canton Public School District.

Private schools:
 Canton Academy
 Madison-Ridgeland Academy
 St. Andrew's Episcopal School (Secondary school campus)
 St. Joseph Catholic School (of the Roman Catholic Diocese of Jackson)
 Veritas School (CLOSED)

The local community college is Holmes Community College.

Tougaloo College is in Madison County.

See also
 National Register of Historic Places listings in Madison County, Mississippi

References

 
Mississippi counties
Jackson metropolitan area, Mississippi
1828 establishments in Mississippi
Populated places established in 1828